Anastasia Konstantinovna Nazarenko (born 17 January 1993) is a Russian group rhythmic gymnast.  She is the 2012 Olympics Group All-around champion, the 2011 World Group All-around silver medalist and the 2010 European Group All-around gold medalist.

Career

She competed at the 2011 World Championships in Montpellier, France, where she together with the other Russian group received a gold medal in 5 Balls final and silver medals in Group All-around and 3 Ribbons + 2 Hoops Final.

Nazarenko won a gold medal at the 2012 Summer Olympics in the group all-around event together with other group members (Uliana Donskova, Anastasia Bliznyuk, Alina Makarenko, Ksenia Dudkina, Karolina Sevastyanova).  For six months leading up to the Olympic Games, the Russian gymnasts only ate buckwheat in their diet.

She returned to competition in the Russian Group at the 2013 Sofia World Cup where they won the silver medal in Group All-around and gold in 2 ribbons/3 balls final. At the Minsk World Cup they won another gold in Group All-around, silver in 2 ribbons/3 balls and bronze in 10 clubs. She and the rest Russian Group won all the gold medals at the 2013 Summer Universiade in All-around, 10 clubs and 2 ribbons/3 balls. The Russian Group won the gold medals in Group All-around, 10 clubs and 2 ribbons/3 balls at the 2013 World Cup Final in St. Petersburg, Russia. They also won the Group All-around bronze medal at the 2013 World Championships, they won gold in 2 Ribbon + 3 Balls final. Nastya along with rest of the remaining Russian Group Olympians terminated their careers after the World Championships. Irina Viner has stated about their dismissal and retirements: "We have made drastic changes in the composition of the group. All the girls, who a year ago at the Olympic Games were the first after the World Cup series had to say goodbye to the sport. They did not show in Kiev what could and should have been shown. The "star disease" should not be left on the carpet. And I always say that as long as you're standing on a pedestal - you're a winner, but as soon as you had gone down from it- you're no one to call you in any way".

Detailed Olympic results

References

External links

 
 
 
 

1993 births
Living people
Russian rhythmic gymnasts
Gymnasts at the 2012 Summer Olympics
Medalists at the 2012 Summer Olympics
Olympic gold medalists for Russia
Olympic gymnasts of Russia
Olympic medalists in gymnastics
Medalists at the Rhythmic Gymnastics World Championships
Medalists at the Rhythmic Gymnastics European Championships
Universiade gold medalists for Russia
Universiade medalists in gymnastics
Medalists at the 2013 Summer Universiade